Sage Creek is a  long 2nd order tributary to the Fisher River in Surry County, North Carolina.

Course
Sage Creek rises on the divide of an unnamed tributary to the Fisher River about 1.5 miles west of Buck Mountain.  Sage Creek then flows southwest to join the Fisher River about 0.5 miles southeast of Ladonia, North Carolina.

Watershed
Sage Creek drains  of area, receives about 48.1 in/year of precipitation, has a wetness index of 250.61, and is about 66% forested.

See also
List of rivers of North Carolina

References

Rivers of North Carolina
Rivers of Surry County, North Carolina